The Bloch MB.130 and its derivatives were a series of French monoplane reconnaissance-bombers developed during the 1930s. They saw some limited action at the beginning of World War II but were obsolete by that time and suffered badly against the Luftwaffe. After the fall of France, a few were pressed into Luftwaffe service.

Design and development
The MB.130 was developed in response to the August 1933 French Aviation Ministry request for a reconnaissance and tactical bomber. It was an all-metal, twin-engine, low-wing monoplane with retractable landing gear, and armed with three flexible machine guns, one each in the nose, dorsal turret, and ventral gondola. It first flew on 29 June 1934, and despite very ordinary performance, soon entered production, 40 machines being ordered in October 1935. An improved version, the MB.131 was first flown on 16 August 1936, but still needed more work to overcome its deficiencies. The radically revised second prototype which flew on 5 May 1937 eventually formed the basis for series production, with aircraft being manufactured by SNCASO, the nationalised company that had absorbed Bloch and Blériot. Total production (including prototypes) was 143.

MB.135
A four-engined derivative of the MB.134, was developed powered by four  Gnome-Rhône 14M 14 cylinder radial engines, with an essentially similar airframe. The sole example flew for the first time on 12 January 1939.

Operational history
Entering service in June 1938, the MB.131 went on to equip seven reconnaissance Groupes, six in metropolitan France and one in North Africa. Upon the outbreak of the war, the metropolitan Groupes suffered heavy losses in attempts at daylight reconnaissance of Germany's western borders. They were subsequently restricted to flying night missions, though they still suffered heavy losses even then. By May 1940, all metropolitan units had been converted to Potez 63.11 aircraft, with only the African groupe retaining them for front-line duty.

After the Battle of France, the planes left in Vichy possession were relegated to target towing duty. 21 planes were reported captured by the Luftwaffe in inoperable condition, but photographic evidence suggests at least a few flew for the Nazis.

Variants

MB.130.01
Original prototype, 2x Gnome-Rhône 14Kdrs engines.
MB.131.01
First prototype, 2x Gnome-Rhône 14N-10.
MB.131.02
Second prototype with revised wings, tail, and fuselage
MB.131R4
Initial versions with one central machine gun, 13 built. Note: Breffort and Joiuineau say that 14 R4 aircraft were built.
MB.131Ins
Dual control instructor version, 5 built.
MB.131RB4
Four-seat reconnaissance-bomber aircraft. Internal bomb bay and revised equipment. 121 built, including two prototypes refitted to this standard. Note: Breffort and Joiuineau say that 100 RB4 aircraft were built.
MB.133
Prototype with redesigned tail, 1 built.
MB.134
Prototype with two  Hispano-Suiza 14AA engines, 1 built.
MB.135
A four engined derivative of the MB.134, powered by four  Gnome-Rhône 14M 14 cylinder radial engines.
MB.136

Operators

French Air Force operated 141 aircraft.
 Vichy France
 Vichy aviation operated some aircraft.

Luftwaffe operated captured aircraft in restricted roles.

Polish Air Forces in exile in France
Groupe de Bombardement Marche Polonais

Specifications (MB.131RB.4)

See also

References

Bibliography

 Green, William. War Planes of the Second World War: Volume Seven Bombers and Reconnaissance Aircraft. London: Macdonald, 1967.

External links

Dassault official home page

MB.131
1930s French bomber aircraft
1930s French military reconnaissance aircraft
Aircraft first flown in 1934
Twin piston-engined tractor aircraft